County Road 341 is a  road in the municipality of Rindal in Møre og Romsdal County, Norway. It runs between Rindal, where it branches off from County Road 340, and Setra, where it dead ends in a spur. Before the terminus of the road, County Road 345 branches off to the southeast, continuing as County Road 487 in Sør-Trøndelag County, thereby creating the westernmost traffic connection between the Surna Valley and the Orkla Valley. The road runs in a southeast direction, parallel to the Rinda and Ljøsåa Rivers, past the village of Romundstad. A monument to the politician John Neergaard stands next to the road near his birthplace in Romundstad.

References

External links
Statens vegvesen – trafikkmeldinger Fv341 (Traffic Information: County Road 341)

341
Rindal